Beaucourt is a commune in the Territoire de Belfort department in Bourgogne-Franche-Comté in northeastern France. The archivist and palaeographer Élie Berger (1850–1925) was born in Beaucourt.

Population

Literature
Beaucourt Revisited is a war poem by A.P. Herbert.

See also

Communes of the Territoire de Belfort department

References

Communes of the Territoire de Belfort